Bu'eine Nujeidat is an Arab local council in the Northern District of Israel. Made up of two villages, Bu'eine and Nujeidat, they merged in 1987 and were recognized as one local council in 1996.

History
Bu'eine is a village located on an ancient site. A small jug from the  Iron Age, and potsherds from the Roman and  Byzantine periods have been found here.  A possible Roman or Byzantine grave is also located here.

Potsherds from the early Islamic and  Mamluk period have also been found.

Ottoman Empire
The population was 38 households and 6 bachelors, all Muslim. They paid  a fixed tax-rate of 25% on agricultural products, including  wheat, barley, fruit trees and cotton, in addition to occasional revenues, and goats and beehives; a total of 2420 akçe.

A map from Napoleon's invasion of 1799 by Pierre Jacotin  showed Bu'eine, named as Beni.

In 1875,  when Victor Guérin visited, the village had at most 150 inhabitants. Guérin further noted that "below the village, on the north-east side, a curious reservoir cut in the rock, with three troughs. Steps lead down into it. Within it is covered with a thick cement, and vaulted over with cut stones. The water formerly flowed into it through a conduit now choked. The mosque of the village is an ancient church, a new door having been made in the north side. The slopes of the hill were formerly covered with houses, built in terraces. Rude characters were found traced on the rocks about 600 paces to the east of the village."

In 1881  the PEF's Survey of Western Palestine (SWP) described El Baineh as, "a village built on the hillside, containing 200 Moslem inhabitants. It possesses a spring, and there are olive-groves in the plain to the north."

British Mandate
In the 1922 census of Palestine conducted  by the British Mandate authorities, Bu’aniyeh  had a population of 212, all Muslims, increasing in the 1931 census  to 349, of whom 2 were Jews and the rest Muslims, in a total of 67 occupied houses.

In the 1945 statistics  the population of Bu'eina was 540, all Muslims, while the total land area was 9,214 dunams, according to an official land and population survey. Of this, 782  were allocated for plantations and irrigable land, 13,223 for cereals, while 30 dunams were classified as built-up areas. All the inhabitants were Muslim.

Israel
Bu'eine was captured by the Israeli army during the second part of Operation Dekel, 15–18 July 1948. It remained under Martial Law until 1966.

See also
 Arab localities in Israel

References

Bibliography

 

 

  
 
 
 
 

 
 

 

 (p. 80)

External links
 Welcome To Bu'eina
Welcome To Nujeidat
Survey of Western Palestine, Map 6:  IAA, Wikimedia commons

Arab localities in Israel
1987 establishments in Israel
Local councils in Northern District (Israel)